Austin Smith (born 25 November 1993) is an American tennis player.

Smith has a career high ATP singles ranking of World No. 771 achieved on 26 June 2017. He also has a career high ATP doubles ranking of World No. 705 achieved on 3 April 2017.

Smith made his ATP debut at the 2016 BB&T Atlanta Open when he was granted a wild card entry into the singles main draw. He was defeated by compatriot Taylor Fritz in straight sets 2–6, 2–6.

Smith has reached one career singles final, winning the title at the Israel F13  ITF Futures tournament in September 2016 against Daniel Cukierman 6–1, 6–2. Additionally, he has reach three career doubles finals but has yet to win a doubles title at any level.

Smith played college tennis at the University of Georgia.

ATP Challenger and ITF Futures finals

Singles: 1 (1–0)

Doubles: 3 (0–3)

References

External links

1993 births
Living people
American male tennis players
Tennis people from Georgia (U.S. state)
Georgia Bulldogs tennis players
20th-century American people
21st-century American people